William David O'Brien (August 3, 1878 – February 19, 1962) was an American prelate of the Roman Catholic Church. He served as an auxiliary bishop of the Archdiocese of Chicago from 1934 until his death in 1962, and was named an Archbishop in 1953.

Early life and education
William O'Brien was born in Chicago, Illinois, to Charles D. and Alice M. (née O'Hara) O'Brien. He received his early education at Kinzie Grade School and at the Christian Brothers' school at Holy Name Cathedral. In 1899, he became one of the first two graduates of St. Vincent's College (later DePaul University) in Chicago. He then studied for the priesthood at Kenrick Seminary in St. Louis, Missouri. O'Brien was ordained a priest by Archbishop James Edward Quigley on July 11, 1903.

Priesthood
His first assignment was as a curate at St. Basil's Church on 1850 Garfield Boulevard, where he remained for four years. In 1907, he was named assistant to Monsignor Francis Kelley, director of the Catholic Church Extension Society. In addition to his duties with the Extension Society, O'Brien became pastor of St. John's Church on 100 W. 18th Street in 1924. He was named a papal chamberlain in 1924, and raised to the rank of domestic prelate in 1926. He was the first priest to receive papal honors from the archdiocese's first cardinal, George Mundelein. He became president of the Extension Society in 1925, after Monsignor Kelley was appointed Bishop of Oklahoma. As president, he also served as editor of the monthly Extension Magazine.

Episcopacy
On February 10, 1934, O'Brien was appointed auxiliary bishop of Chicago and titular bishop of Calynda by Pope Pius XI. He received his episcopal consecration on the following April 25 from Cardinal Mundelein, with Bishops Joseph Patrick Lynch and Bernard James Sheil, at Holy Name Cathedral. As an auxiliary bishop, he continued to serve as president of the Extension Society and pastor of St. John's Church, both offices which he held until his death. 

In 1927,  O'Brien attended an event sponsored by the Fascist Government of Italy. He was dressed in bishop's vestments for the occasion. During the playing of the Giovinezza, the Italian Fascist anthem, O'Brien gave a roman salute, another trademark of fascism. In 1940, Italy gave O'Brien the Commander of the Order of the Crown Award.

O'Brien was named an Assistant at the Pontifical Throne in 1947. On November 18, 1953, O'Brien was elevated to the rank of Titular Archbishop of Calynda by Pope Pius XII. L'Osservatore Romano reported that his elevation was due to his "tireless work" with the Extension Society. He was the first Catholic bishop in the United States who was not the head of a diocese to be named an archbishop.

O'Brien was unanimously re-elected president of the Extension Society in 1954. In his later years, he relinquished the editorship of the Extension Magazine and delegated many of his administrative duties, but still closely following the society's activities and frequently visiting its headquarters. He died at Little Company of Mary Hospital in San Pierre, Indiana, at age 83.

References

1878 births
1962 deaths
Clergy from Chicago
20th-century Roman Catholic bishops in the United States
DePaul University alumni
Kenrick–Glennon Seminary alumni
Roman Catholic Archdiocese of Chicago
Religious leaders from Illinois
Catholics from Illinois
20th-century American Roman Catholic titular archbishops